Natural Colors is a covers album by Priscilla Ahn. It was released in Japan on June 27, 2012.

Track listing 

Priscilla Ahn albums
2012 albums